Maria Lourdes Jimenez Carvajal (August 6, 1944 – September 26, 2003), popularly known as Inday Badiday, was a Filipino TV host and journalist who was known as Philippine television's "queen of showbiz talk shows" and "queen of intrigues".

Biography
The name "Inday Badiday" was coined by her mother Lala, from the word “Inday” as “Girly” and “Badiday” as “Gay (Bading) or Flamboyant”, referring to the titillating nature of the gossip industry.   

Her commentary and knowledge about the industry eventually brought her fame. She was also known for her charitable TV segment of announcing lost or kidnapped children in her media platforms. She is also a columnist for different showbiz & movie magazines Eyebugs: Bigay Hilig sa Balitang Showbiz, Modern Romances and Tsismis.

One of her first shows was Nothing but the Truth and later See-True and Eye to Eye, which served as Philippine television's template for showbiz talk shows. These shows were all produced by GMA News and Public Affairs and her production company, LoCa Productions (LoCa is the combination of the first two letters of her names, Lourdes Carvajal). She made her television comeback on GMA Network in 2002 with the show Inday, Heart to Heart.

Death
Inday Badiday died on September 26  2003, aged 59 years old, from multiple organ failure due to two strokes, at St. Luke's Medical Center, Quezon City. She was the former spouse of costume and makeup artist, Ernie Carvajal and had three children and was the grandmother of IC Mendoza. 

On April 1, 2004, GMA Network's drama anthology Magpakailanman aired her life story. To pay respect, Angelu de Leon played the role (aside from this, the actual props from her former shows, such as See True and Eye to Eye, were used). In later years, her image became iconic due to her baritone or “raspy” voice on both radio and television.

References

External links

1944 births
2003 deaths
Deaths from multiple organ failure
Filipino Roman Catholics
Filipino television talk show hosts
Filipino television journalists
Actresses from Misamis Oriental
Burials at the Manila Memorial Park – Sucat
RPN News and Public Affairs people
GMA Network personalities
GMA Integrated News and Public Affairs people
Women television journalists